Jacob Derwig (The Hague, 15 July 1969) is a Dutch actor.

Film and television 
He recently played roles in box-office hit Family Way (2012) (for which he won a Golden Calf), The Dinner (2013), Public Works (2015), and in the highly popular Dutch crime-series Penoza (2015), directed by Diederik van Rooijen, and as Marius Milner in Klem (2016). Currently Jacob stars in the brand new television-serie The Terrible Eighties (2022).

Private life

Derwig is married to actress and screenwriter Kim van Kooten, with whom he has two children, Roman and Kee Molly (born 17 December 2007). They met on the set of the TV-series De acteurs (The actors), where various actors played different roles written by Van Kooten.

Filmography

Television series
All stars - De serie episode "Paard van Troje" (1999)
Bij ons in de Jordaan (2000)
De acteurs (2001)
The Enclave (2002)
Offers (2005)
In Therapie (2010 - 2011)

Films
Coma (1994)
The Dress  (1996)
Temmink: The Ultimate Fight (1998)
Leak (2000)
Îles flottantes (2001)
Zus & Zo (2001)
Grimm (2003)
Tiramisu (2008)
Family Way (2012)
The Dinner (2013)
Public Works (2016)
The Resistance Banker (2018)
Klem (2023)

References

External links

Jacob Derwig at the website of his agency 

1969 births
Living people
Dutch male film actors
Dutch male television actors
Golden Calf winners
Male actors from The Hague
20th-century Dutch male actors
21st-century Dutch male actors